Devonia was the United States Post Office designation for the former coal mining camp in Anderson County, Tennessee, also known as Moore's Camp.  The Devonia post office, established in 1920, served Moore's Camp, plus the nearby communities of Rosedale, Fork Mountain, Braytown, and Charley's Branch, until it closed in 1975.

Devonia is the site of a coal preparation plant. Tennessee State Route 116 traverses the area and a  railroad line connects the community with Oneida, Tennessee.

References

Mining communities in Tennessee
Unincorporated communities in Tennessee
Unincorporated communities in Anderson County, Tennessee